Christian Castillo may refer to:

 Christian Castillo (politician) (born 1967), activist in the Socialist Workers' Party (Argentina)
 Christian Castillo (footballer) (born 1984), Salvadoran footballer